The Frauen-Bundesliga 2003–04 was the 14th season of the Frauen-Bundesliga, Germany's premier football league. It began on 17 August 2003 and ended on 13 June 2004.

1. FFC Turbine Potsdam won its first national championship. The deciding match for the season's title happened on the last match day, when leading Potsdam met Frankfurt, who stood unbeaten in place 2. Frankfurt needed a win to surpass Potsdam, but failed to do so, receiving their only defeat that season with a 2–7.

Final standings

Results

Top scorers

References

2003-04
Ger
1
Women